"Being Boiled" is the debut single by the British synthpop band the Human League. Composed by Martyn Ware and Ian Craig Marsh, with lyrics by Philip Oakey, it has been released several times since 1978, finally becoming a UK top ten hit in 1982.

Different versions
"Being Boiled" was first released as a single in 1978 on the Fast Product label, and although failing to chart, was influential amongst other new wave and post-punk artists. In 1987, this version was added as a bonus track to the CD edition of the band's debut album Reproduction.

The band recorded a new version as part of a session for the John Peel radio programme in the summer of 1978. The session was recorded 8 August 1978 and broadcast on 16 August. Among the four songs recorded, "Being Boiled" is the only one which has had an official release.

A totally re-recorded version of "Being Boiled" was included on the band's Holiday '80 EP, which reached number 56 in 1980 and number 46 in 1982. This version was also included on their 1980 Travelogue album, and is also available on the Original Remixes and Rarities compilation album (2005).

A stereo remix of the original mono Fast Product version was released as a single in August 1980 through EMI Records, failing to chart. This stereo remix was then reissued in January 1982, this time reaching Number 6 in the UK Charts, shortly after the band's commercial breakthrough with Dare and "Don't You Want Me". It was later included on their Greatest Hits anthology released in 1988. It has also been released on subsequent greatest hits albums.

Track lists
7" single (1978 Fast Product release)
 "Being Boiled" (original version)
 "Circus of Death" (original version)

Holiday '80 EP (Virgin Records release)
 "Being Boiled" (re-recorded version)
 "Marianne"
 "Dancevision"
 "Rock 'N' Roll"/"Nightclubbing" medley

1980 EMI release and 1982 EMI reissue
 "Being Boiled" (stereo remix of the original version)
 "Circus of Death" (stereo remix of the original version)

Style
"Being Boiled" was one of the first mainstream British singles to use entirely electronic instruments, and is strikingly different from and darker than the group's more well known songs.

It was influenced by Kraftwerk, German krautrock such as Can and Neu!, American funk bands Funkadelic and Parliament and the attitudes of punk placed in a different context.

It has a strong bassline, compared to Bootsy Collins. The lyrics, described as "bizarre" and "confused",
 combine a protest against silk farming with vague mention of oriental religion - ("Listen to the voice of Buddha/saying stop your sericulture"). In Japan, the sound of bells are referred to as "the voice of Buddha".

Origin
The song's music predates Philip Oakey's joining the band. The Future, a band comprising Martyn Ware and Ian Craig Marsh, had just parted company with singer Adi Newton, later of Clock DVA. Needing a new singer, they contacted former schoolmate Philip Oakey, giving him the music to listen to. Two days later he was back, having written the lyrics. "That was the first thing I heard Phil do," Marsh recalled, "and I immediately thought, 'You've definitely got the job.'"

The original version was recorded on a domestic tape recorder, in mono, in an abandoned factory, at a cost of £2.50.

Fast Product release
Fellow Sheffield musician Paul Bowers (of the band 2.3) liked the song and passed a copy to Fast Product label manager Bob Last, who had just released 2.3's first single ("All Time Low"/"Where To Now?"). Fast Product released "Being Boiled" in June 1978, the sleeve bearing the slogan "Electronically Yours".

A press release was put out by Fast Product on computer paper - at the time a novel idea. It read, in part:

The League would like to positively affect the future by close attention to the present, allying technology with humanity and humour. They have been described as 'Later Twentieth Century Boys' and 'Intelligent, Innovatory and Immodest'.

Also included in the release were a cassette of demo recordings and a sticker bearing the "Electronically Yours" slogan.

Reception
The song received a mixed reception among established artists of the time. David Bowie declared it to be "the future of music", but former Sex Pistols singer John Lydon, reviewing the single for the New Musical Express, dismissed the band as "trendy hippies". Peter York in Harper's and Queen cited the cover as an example of "post-modern packaging".

The song has become an influence on several musicians. Gary Numan has named it one of his favourite songs. Andy McCluskey of OMD called it "a great piece of music". Vince Clarke stated that the song was his favourite record and one of his inspirations in forming Depeche Mode.

Circus of Death
The B-side, "Circus of Death", begins with the following spoken introduction by Phil Oakey:

"This is a song called "The Circus of Death". It tells the true story of a circus we met. The first two verses concern the actual arrival at Heathrow Airport of Commissioner Steve McGarrett. The third emotionally describes a map showing the range of the circus. The fourth and fifth were extracted from an article in The Guardian of March the 19th, 1962. The last is a short wave radio message from the last man on Earth."

The "McGarrett" referred to was a character from the television show Hawaii Five-O.

There are at least three different versions of "Circus of Death": the first is the original Fast Product version, the second is a totally re-recorded version included on the Reproduction album, the third is a stereo remix of the original version (released as a B-side on the 1980 EMI issue of "Being Boiled").

The spoken-word introduction was taken from a live television broadcast by LWT continuity announcer Peter Lewis.

The original take was added as a bonus track on the Reproduction CD edition, although without a sample from the 1974 film Dark Star that marked the end of the vinyl version. The re-recorded Reproduction version contains a shorter and totally different spoken intro.

The stereo remix of the original version has not been issued on CD.

Holiday '80

In early 1980, now signed to Virgin Records, the band re-recorded "Being Boiled" for their Holiday '80 double single. This release flopped, and a normal one-disc EP was hurriedly put out. This reached Number 56 and the band were asked to appear on Top of the Pops to perform their cover version of Rock 'n' Roll also featured on the single, an unusual request by the programme, which usually only featured Top 40 acts. Holiday '80 was later reissued in 1982 on the back of the band's success in 1981, reaching Number 46.

References

1978 debut singles
1982 singles
The Human League songs
Songs written by Philip Oakey
Songs written by Martyn Ware
Songs written by Ian Craig Marsh
1978 songs
Virgin Records singles